Elterwater Bridge is a Grade II listed single-arch bridge spanning Great Langdale Beck in Elterwater, Cumbria, England. The structure dates back to 1702.

The bridge, which has subsequently been widened, has a level parapet.

See also
Listed buildings in Lakes, Cumbria

References

Grade II listed buildings in Cumbria
Bridges in Cumbria
Stone bridges in England
Road bridges in England
Bridges completed in 1702
1702 establishments in England